Neophisis is a genus of Asian bush crickets belonging to the tribe Phisidini: in the subfamily Meconematinae.

Species
The Orthoptera Species File lists:
subgenus Anaphisis Gorochov, 2019
Distribution: New Guinea
 Neophisis halmahera Gorochov, 2012
 Neophisis supiori Gorochov, 2004
subgenus Indophisis Jin, 1990
Distribution:  Indochina, Malesia, Philippines, Taiwan, Japan
 Neophisis brevipennis (Kästner, 1933)
 Neophisis curvata Jin, 1992
 Neophisis gracilipennis Jin, 1992
 Neophisis gracilipes (Stål, 1877)
 Neophisis iriomotensis Jin, Kevan & Yamasaki, 1990
 Neophisis kotoshoensis (Shiraki, 1930)
 Neophisis longipennis Jin, 1992
 Neophisis meiopennis Jin, 1992
 Neophisis mentawaiensis Jin, 1992
 Neophisis montealegrei Tan, Jin, Baroga-Barbecho & Yap, 2020
 Neophisis philippinarum (Karny, 1920)
 Neophisis philorites Jin, 1992
 Neophisis sarasini (Karny, 1931)
 Neophisis tangkoko Gorochov, 2012
subgenus Megaphisis Kevan, 1992
Distribution:  Pacific Islands
 Neophisis echinata (Redtenbacher, 1891)
 Neophisis salomonensis Jin, 1992
subgenus Neophisis Jin, 1990
Distribution:  Australia, New Guinea, Malesia (including the Philippines)
 Neophisis arachnoides (Bolívar, 1905) - type species (as Teuthras arachnoides Bolívar)
 Neophisis brachyptera Kevan, 1992
 Neophisis buloloensis Jin, 1992
 Neophisis crassipes (Bolívar, 1905)
 Neophisis curvicaudata Jin, 1992
 Neophisis ecmurra Rentz, 2001
 Neophisis leptoptera Jin, 1992
 Neophisis longicercata Jin, 1992
 Neophisis longifenestrata Jin, 1992
 Neophisis longiplata Jin, 1992
 Neophisis longistylata Jin, 1992
 Neophisis megaurita Jin, 1992
 Neophisis novemspinata Jin, 1992
 Neophisis obiensis (Hebard, 1922)
 Neophisis phymacercata Jin, 1992
 Neophisis pogonopoda (Montrouzier, 1855)
 Neophisis robusta Jin, 1992
subgenus Platyphisis Gorochov, 2019
Distribution: Thailand through to Borneo
 Neophisis arcuata Jin, 1992
 Neophisis haani Jin, 1992
 Neophisis malaysiana Gorochov, 2019
 Neophisis sabah Gorochov, 2012
 Neophisis siamensis Jin, 1992

References

External links 

Tettigoniidae genera
Meconematinae
Orthoptera of Indo-China
Orthoptera of Asia